Phillis Nolan (10 February 1946 – 16 March 2022) was an Irish lawn bowler.

Bowls career

World Outdoor Championship
Nolan partnered Margaret Johnston in a very successful pairs team and they won three consecutive World Outdoor Bowls Championships gold medals. The three world titles came at the 1988 World Outdoor Bowls Championship, 1992 World Outdoor Bowls Championship and the 1996 World Outdoor Bowls Championship.

Atlantic Championships
In 1993, she won the pairs gold medal with Barbara Cameron at the inaugural Atlantic Bowls Championships. She went on to win three more medals at the Championships.

British Isles
She also won the British Isles Bowls Championships singles title three times in 1992, 1993 and 2005, a record only bettered by fellow Irish bowler Margaret Johnston and won the 2014 triples title at the Irish National Bowls Championships bowling for the Blackrock Bowls Club.

Family
Her son John Nolan was the 1991 singles champion at the Irish National Bowls Championships.

References

1946 births
2022 deaths
Bowls World Champions
Irish lawn bowls players
People from Bray, County Wicklow